Kejnice is a municipality and village in Klatovy District in the Plzeň Region of the Czech Republic. It has about 100 inhabitants.

Administrative parts
The village of Karlovce is an administrative part of Kejnice.

Gallery

References

Villages in Klatovy District